Daniel Rosa or Rosas may refer to:

Musicians
Daniel Rosa, contestant on The Voice (U.S. season 3)
Daniel Rosa (violinist) on Dream This

Sportspeople
Daniel la Rosa (born 1985), German racing driver
Daniel Rosas (born 1989), Mexican boxer

Other(s)
Daniel Rosas Sanchez, fictional character in Man on Fire (2004 film)
Daniel Pagan Rosas of Vía Verde project